Caroline Ward (born 30 September 1969) is an Australian former cricket player.

She played domestic cricket for the South Australian Women's cricket team between 1990 and 2002. Ward played one Test and one One Day International for the Australia national women's cricket team.

 Ward shares the record of four catches taken in a Women's National Cricket League match with Jude Coleman and Belinda Clark.

References

External links
 Caroline Ward at southernstars.org.au

Living people
1969 births
Australia women Test cricketers
Australia women One Day International cricketers
Cricketers from Adelaide